Week 0 (or Week Zero) refers to the opening weekend of college football games in the NCAA Division I Football Bowl Subdivision (FBS), in which a small number of games are played to begin the regular season, a week before the vast majority of teams begin their season in "Week 1". Although the FBS football season has traditionally begun on the first Saturday before Labor Day, the NCAA has sporadically awarded waivers for games to be played a week earlier in order to bring a game to a national television audience, or as part of the "Hawaii Rule" that grants teams that play a game in Hawaii an extra regular season home game to offset travel costs. The first Week 0 game was the 1983 Kickoff Classic, in which No. 1 Nebraska defeated No. 4 Penn State, 44–6, at Giants Stadium in East Rutherford, New Jersey.

For the 2020 season, the NCAA issued a blanket waiver for Week 0 games by any team, in order to allow for scheduling flexibility amid the COVID-19 pandemic.  However, no Division I FBS members wound up playing in a Week 0 game in 2020.

Results
Week 0 games since 2002:

Rankings reflect preseason AP Poll.

Notes

See also
 FCS Kickoff, a Week 0 game featuring two Division I FCS teams that has been played since 2014
 MEAC/SWAC Challenge, a game featuring teams from the two historically black FCS conferences that has taken place on Week 0 since 2021

References

NCAA Division I FBS football